Gael Kapia Mawete (born September 30, 1991), known professionally as Gaz Mawete is a Congolese singer-songwriter and dancer originally from Democratic Republic of the Congo he's also known for his song "Olingi Nini" that went viral on YouTube with over 5 million views.

Early life 
Gas Mawete was born to a family of seven that has two girls and five boys. He is the youngest of the family.

Career 
Gaz Mawete was a candidate for the Vodacom Congo super-hook-up TV season 2 in 2011. It was for the first time that he was discovered for his courage, talent and voice. In 2013, he released his first single "Tupendana" followed by  "Chérie à dit" & "Lisolo" which did not have a great success, it is in 2014 that released the title "etali nga te" & "mukolo Ya Zoba" which allowed him to gain confidence and embark on a solo career. He also participated in the first audition of The Voice Afrique Francophone in 2016. But it did not work for Gaz as he was always eliminated at the audition blind. After the failure to the voice the artist had balance a tube called "Pika" which had a great success and which allowed the artist to win the competition.

In September 2017 Vodacom and Pygma had the idea to look like a few candidates who have passed to previous editions for a new edition named Vodacom Best of the Best All Star from where the winner must signed with the prestigious label Bomaye Musik but It was not easy for Gaz at the end of the competition

In November 2017, Gaz mawete won and was crowned best star by Vodacom Best of the Best All Star in the presence of Yousoupha, and other superstars. After a successful trip Gaz mawete signed a contract with the label Bomaye Musik. and publishes her first audio and clip "Paulina" after his victory in competition on Vodacom Best of the Best All star under the label of Bomaye Musik. then Gaz Mawete continues to grow and finally publishes his second single "Olingi Nini" on August 10, 2018 which is a huge success for his career, with more than 10,000 YouTube hits in 3 days that accumulate more than 5 million views on YouTube for now, on March 8, 2019 Gaz Mawete publishes his new song entitled "antidote" that has more than 1,000,000 views on July 30 he published "La loi du talion"

Gaz participated in the album of the French artist Dadju that was released in November 2019 on a song the title "Mwasi Ya Congo" Gaz was also in the reissue of cameroonese artist Locko. Gaz he's also performed concert at the zenith of Paris on October 30 with the Artist Naza.

Awards and nominations

Afrima Awards 2018 

|-
|2018
|Gaz Mawete
|AFRIMA – Best Male Central Africa
|
|-

|2019
|Gaz Mawete
|AFRIMA – Best Newcomer
|
|-
|2019
|Best Africa New Artist
|African Talent Awards 
|

|-

|2020
|VIDEO OF THE YEAR
|AFRIMA
|

Discography

Albums 

 2017: Bombanda
 2019: Tsunga avant l'album - EP

Singles

See also 

 Youssoupha
 KeBlack
 Innoss'B
 Naza
 Fally Ipupa

External links 
 Gaz Mawete on YouTube
 Gaz Mawete on Instagram

References 

Living people
People from Kinshasa
21st-century Democratic Republic of the Congo male singers
Democratic Republic of the Congo songwriters
1991 births
21st-century Democratic Republic of the Congo people